Disaneng Dam, is an earth-fill type dam on the Molopo River in the Ratlou Local Municipality, near to the border of the Mahikeng Local Municipality and not far from Mmabatho, North West, South Africa. It was established in 1980 and its primary purpose is for irrigation.

It offers great fishing opportunities for species such as carp, king carp, tilapia, catfish and recently introduced species of bass which is slowly taking over this dam.  At the dam wall, there are huge gathering of migratory birds.

See also
List of reservoirs and dams in South Africa
List of rivers of South Africa

References 

 List of South African Dams from the Department of Water Affairs and Forestry (South Africa)

 www.dams.com/learn

Dams in South Africa
Dams completed in 1980